James W. Mickens is an American computer scientist and the Gordon McKay Professor of Computer Science at Harvard John A. Paulson School of Engineering and Applied Sciences at Harvard University. His research focuses on distributed systems, such as large-scale services and ways to make them more secure. He is critical of machine learning as a boilerplate solution to most outstanding computational problems.

Early life and education 
James Mickens was raised in Atlanta. His father is physicist and mathematician Ronald E. Mickens.

Mickens earned a Bachelors of Science in Computer Science from the Georgia Institute of Technology in 2001, as well as a Ph.D. in computer science from the University of Michigan in 2008.

Career 
Mickens worked as a member of the Distributed Systems group at Microsoft Research from 2009 through 2015. He spent one semester at the Massachusetts Institute of Technology (MIT) through the MLK Visiting Professors program becoming a professor at the Harvard John A. Paulson School of Engineering and Applied Sciences in 2015, where he was awarded tenure in 2019. In 2016, he was one of the researchers working on Polaris, a new system designed at MIT to decrease the loading time for webpages.

In 2020, Mickens was appointed to the Board of Directors of the Berkman Klein Center for Internet & Society at Harvard University. In 2021, he and Jonathan Zittrain began the Institute for Rebooting Social Media, a three-year-long BKC project to research and create new ideas to improve social media.

Publications

References 

21st-century African-American academics
21st-century African-American scientists
21st-century American academics
21st-century American scientists
Academics from Georgia (U.S. state)
African-American computer scientists
American computer scientists
Computer security academics
Georgia Tech alumni
Harvard University faculty
Living people
Researchers in distributed computing
University of Michigan College of Engineering alumni
Writers from Atlanta
Year of birth missing (living people)